Fred Latremouille (October 21, 1945 – March 5, 2015) was a Canadian radio personality and actor.

Career 
He began working in broadcasting in Alberta and soon moved to Vancouver, where he entered radio in 1962 at the age of 17.

In 1967, he acted as co-editor for the newly created Georgia Straight alternative weekly newspaper. His role included sidewalk sales and a telephone interview with musician John Lennon. Latremouille had been replaced by Red Robinson as the emcee for the Beatles Empire Stadium concert in 1964 due to mononucleosis.

As an actor, he appeared in the movies A Man, a Woman and a Bank (1979), The Changeling (1980), The Plutonium Incident (1981) and Jane Doe (1983). He worked as an on-air host at the CBC, CFUN, KISS FM, [CHMJ] and Clear-FM.

In 2003, he and his wife hosted provincial Premier Gordon Campbell for a dinner during their holiday in Hawaii. After leaving, Campbell was charged by Hawaiian police for drunk driving which created controversy in his home province.

In 2006, Latremouille and his wife and longtime co-host Cathy Baldazzi came out of retirement and launched a morning show on Clear-FM.

Latremouille was inducted into the B.C. Entertainment Hall of Fame in 2006 and was named to the Canadian Association of Broadcasters’ Hall of Fame the following year.

Personal life 
Latremouille was born and raised in Vancouver. His parents divorced when he was two and his mother later remarried, to writer Robert Harlow. In his late 20s, Latrermouille was diagnosed with cancer. In 1986, Latremouille married his co-host at CFUN, Cathy Baldazzi. It was his second marriage.

Filmography

References

External links 
 

1945 births
2015 deaths
CBC Radio hosts
Canadian radio personalities
20th-century Canadian male actors
Male actors from British Columbia
People from Nanaimo